Events in the year 2019 in Honduras.

Incumbents
 President – Juan Orlando Hernández
 National congress president – Mauricio Oliva

Events
August 20: Former First Lady Rosa Elena Bonilla is convicted for embezzling U.S.$600,000 between 2010 and 2014. Her brother-in-law Mauricio Mora was acquitted.
Since October 4 : protests against Juan Orlando Hernández

Deaths

12 January – Jaime Rosenthal, politician, Third Vice President and MP (b. 1936).

References

 
2010s in Honduras
Years of the 21st century in Honduras
Honduras
Honduras